Beixinqiao station is a station on Line 5 and Capital Airport Express of the Beijing Subway. It is located in Beixinqiao Subdistrict, at the intersection of Jiaodaokou East Street to the west, Dongzhimen Inner Street to the east, Yonghegong Street to the north and Dongsi North Street to the south.

Station Layout 
The station has an underground island platform for Line 5 and 2 side platforms for Capital Airport Express.

Exits
There are 5 exits, lettered A, B, C, D and E. Exit D is accessible via a stairlift, and exits A and E are accessible via elevators.

External links

Beijing Subway stations in Dongcheng District